Kashypi Dam, is an earthfill dam on Kashyapi river near Rajapur, Nashik district in the state of Maharashtra in India.

Specifications

Downstream of this dam is the Gangapur Dam which opened in 1965. Due to silt deposition in the reservoir area, the storage capacity of the Gangapur Dam has gradually reduced. The right side canal running towards Nashik is also closed due to the high civilization in the area. For these two reasons, the Kashypi Dam was constructed.

Purpose
 Irrigation

See also
 Dams in Maharashtra
 List of reservoirs and dams in India

References

Dams in Nashik district
Dams completed in 1998
1998 establishments in Maharashtra